Whigfield II is the second studio album by Italian Eurodance project Whigfield which was performed by Danish-born Sannie Charlotte Carlson, released in November 1997.

Five singles were released from this record: "Gimme Gimme", Last Christmas, "No Tears to Cry", "Baby Boy" and "Givin' All My Love".

Track list
Givin' All My Love 3:34
No Tears to Cry (Organ Mix) 3:47
Baby Boy (Original Radio) 3:39
Tenderly 4:01
What We've Done for Love 3:47
Lover 3:56
Gimme Gimme 3:23
Whiggy Whiggle 3:44
Forever on My Mind 4:03
Through the Night 3:54
Summer Samba 3:48
Saturday Night (Edit '97; remixed by M&M) 3:28
Last Christmas (Major Cut) 3:52
Mega Ricks Mix (Think of You/Another Day/Saturday Night/Sexy Eyes; mixed by Edwin & Richard Van 't Oost) 4:28

References

External links

1997 albums
Whigfield albums